The mayor position of Flint, Michigan is a strong mayor-type. In Flint's previous 1929 charter, the mayor was one of the City Commissioners, as the council in a council-manager type government.

1855–1888
The mayor was one of many citywide elected officers including the Recorder, Supervisor, Treasurer, Marshal, Directors of the Poor, School Inspector and Justices of the Peace. Additionally, other administrative officers were selected by wards.

1888 Charter

1929 Charter
Under the 1929 charter, Flint move to a council–manager form of government with the council called the “City Commission.”

1974 Charter
Under the 1974 Charter, the office of mayor is a non-partisan elected position.

References

Flint, Michigan